Charney is a surname. Notable people with the surname include:

Ann Charney (born 1940) Polish-Canadian novelist 
April Charney (born 1957) American consumer advocate
Charles de Lauzon de Charney, Governor of New France (1656–1657)
Dennis Charney American biological psychiatrist
Dov Charney (born 1969), founder and CEO of American Apparel
Evan Charney, American political scientist
Geoffrey de Charney, Preceptor of Normandy for the Knights Templar
Jordan Charney (born 1937), American actor
Jule Gregory Charney (1917–1981), American meteorologist
Leon Charney, American real estate tycoon
Melvin Charney (born 1935), Canadian architect
Noah Charney (born 1979), American art historian and novelist
Peter Charney (born 1989), Guinness World Record holder for Most Indoor Bungee Jumps in 24 Hours
Suzanne Charney (born 1944) American actress and dancer

See also 
Charney Bassett
Charney Road railway station in Mumbai 
Charnay (disambiguation)
Charny (disambiguation)
Czarny
Czerny